The KSU Gazal-1 (Arabic for ‘gazelle') is a sport utility vehicle developed by students at King Saud University and technicians from Magna Steyr. The mass production began on 14 June 2010 under King Abdullah Bin Abdulaziz of Saudi Arabia. The managers of the project are Dr. Abdul Rahman Alahmari and Dr. Saed Darweesh. Dr. Khalid Alsaleh, who registered patents for the vehicle, mentioned in a TV interview that environment specific tests such as camel collision tolerance were conducted. 

The car is the fourth home-made Arab automobile, after the Egyptian Ramses, the Moroccan Laraki and the Libyan Saroukh el-Jamahiriya. With a projected output of 20,000 for 2011, the Gazal-1 was the first Arab vehicle to be mass-produced in the Arab World. 

The KSU Gazal-1 is based on the long-wheeled Mercedes-Benz G 500 AMG and was designed by Studiotorino. Most of the automotive parts are produced by Magna Steyr in Austria. The assembly of the vehicle is made at the assembly plant of MAN Truck & Bus in Jeddah.

External links 
 Official Website 
 KSU Website
 Top Gear Website

Cars of Saudi Arabia
King Saud University
Magna International

Cars introduced in 2010